Tukay-Tamak (Tuqaytamaq) is a rural locality (a village) in Isametovsky Selsoviet, Ilishevsky District, Bashkortostan, Russia. The population was 100 as of 2010. There are 2 streets.

Geography 
Tukay-Tamak is located 30 km west of Verkhneyarkeyevo (the district's administrative centre) by road. Churakayevo is the nearest rural locality.

References 

Rural localities in Ilishevsky District